Mill Hill Broadway railway station is on the Midland Main Line in England, serving the suburb of Mill Hill in the London Borough of Barnet, north London. Its three-letter station code is MIL.

The station is served by Thameslink-operated trains on the Thameslink route. It is in Transport for London's Travelcard Zone 4.

History
The station was built by the Midland Railway as simply "Mill Hill" in 1868 on its extension to St. Pancras, being renamed in 1950. The station was rebuilt in the 1960s in connection with the construction of the M1 motorway.

Since 14 September 2014 train services have been operated by Thameslink.

Prior to the major engineering works to create the "Thameslink Box" at St Pancras, Mill Hill Broadway was also served at peak times by Moorgate fast trains. These trains provided a non-stop service to King's Cross Thameslink twice an hour. In 2009, several morning peak southbound fast services (stopping only at West Hampstead) and several evening peak northbound fast services (stopping only at West Hampstead) were reinstated.

From March 2009, Southeastern and Thameslink began running some peak hour trains from Sevenoaks to Luton, though in the off-peak these services turn back at Kentish Town.

Services
All services at Mill Hill Broadway are operated by Thameslink using  EMUs.

The typical off-peak service in trains per hour is:
 2 tph to  via 

Connections
London Buses routes 114, 186, 221, 240, 251, 302, 303, 605, 628 and 688 serve the station.

Current developments

Thameslink platform extension
In 2010, platform extension (to accommodate 12-car trains) and minor station improvement work completed under way as part of the Thameslink Programme.

Proposed developments

Service changes in 2015
Additional trains from destinations across the larger Thameslink network may call at the station from 2015, however the existing Sutton Loop trains will still continue.

References

Gallery

External links

Railway stations in the London Borough of Barnet
DfT Category D stations
Former Midland Railway stations
Railway stations in Great Britain opened in 1868
Railway stations served by Govia Thameslink Railway
Mill Hill